Harare International School (or HIS) is an international, co-educational, day school in Harare, Zimbabwe with around 415 students from Pre-kindergarten to twelfth grade. HIS is accredited with the Council of International Schools, the New England Association of Schools and Colleges, and the International Baccalaureate Organization. Harare International School is an American-sponsored institution, receiving support from the United States Embassy via an annual grant from the US Department of State's Office for Overseas Schools.

Harare International School was ranked 54th out of the top 100 best high schools in Africa by Africa Almanac in 2003, based upon the quality of education, student engagement, strength and activities of alumni/alumnae, school profile, internet and news visibility. Harare International School was also ranked as one of the Top 10 High Schools in Zimbabwe in 2014.

History
Harare International School was founded on 8 September 1992 and had 42 students initially. The school's first campus was a house located in a suburb close to the central business district of Harare. In 1994, Harare International School commenced a phased relocation to the current Pendennis Road campus in Mount Pleasant, a suburb in northern Harare.

About

Founded in 1992, Harare International School (HIS) is an independent, non-profit institution, serving students in Early Childhood 1 (EC 1) to grade 12.  HIS enrolls approximately 500 students representing over 50 nationalities, including 21% from Europe, 23% from North America, 41% from Africa, 8% from Asia and 7% from other areas of the world.
 
HIS is sponsored by the U.S. Department of State, and the educational program is modeled along North American and International Baccalaureate (IB) guidelines. HIS is fully accredited by the Council of International Schools (CIS) and the New England Association of Schools and Colleges (NEASC). HIS is an IB World School and is authorized to offer the Primary Years Programme and the Diploma Programme. HIS is currently a Middle Years Programme candidate school.

The school has active membership of the Association of International Schools in Africa (AISA), the Association for the Advancement of International Education (AAIE) and the Association for School Curriculum and Development (ASCD).

International Baccalaureate
It has been an IB World school since January 2004, and has been authorised to offer the IB Primary Years Programme since June 2004.It also offers the IB Middle Years Program and the IB Diploma Program.

Athletics
Harare International School is a member of the International Schools of Southern and Eastern Africa (ISSEA), a regional athletic and extra-curricular association of eight international schools in eight countries, South Africa, Zambia, Mozambique, Kenya, Ethiopia, Uganda and Tanzania. The schools meet on a regular basis for cultural/academic activities namely Drama, Music and STEM and also compete against each other in Track and Field, Swimming, Basketball, Soccer, and Volleyball hosted by member schools on a rotational basis.

Alumni 
 Vangelis Haritatos - Zimbabwean politician and businessman

See also 

 List of schools in Zimbabwe
 List of international schools

References

External links 
 
 Harare International School on Zimbabwe Schools Guide

High schools in Zimbabwe
Schools in Harare
Private schools in Zimbabwe
International schools in Zimbabwe
Day schools in Zimbabwe
International Baccalaureate schools in Zimbabwe
Educational institutions established in 1992
1992 establishments in Zimbabwe